PTV National Awards was an awards ceremony annually held by the Pakistan Television Corporation. The awards were first introduced in the late 1970s to encourage talented people in Pakistan.

History 
The PTV awards is the largest awards ceremony in the country and is presented by the government of Pakistan's largest media group. The Pakistan Television Corporation established the PTV Awards in 1970 from Karachi Headquarters. The awards were not famous in the start but became popular after the fifth PTV Awards ceremony. In the 2000s, the management of the corporation extended the awards to privately working talent on different private channels. PTV has been the parent platform for most contemporary Pakistani actors and singers.

Chief guest 
The chief guest of the PTV Awards is usually a head of state or government like the Honorable Prime Minister, Honorable President or Minister of Information and Broadcasting.

Categories 
Following is the list of awards.

Record of the awards
Following is the detailed table of awards presented so far.

See also

 List of Asian television awards

References

External links 
 Pakistan Television's official corporate website (archived)
 , 17th PTV Awards on Facebook

 
Pakistan Television Corporation
Annual events in Pakistan
Pakistani film awards
Pakistani television awards